Misket is a type of dance/folk music from the Ankara, and Aegean regions in Turkey. The word literally means marble (toy) in Turkish and is also a small and very sweet apple variety when spelled "Misget".  .

The song is about lost love and suffering. Lyrics open with "Dove flew away" symbolizing a girl named Misget, who dies.

Lyrics (translated from Turkish)

Dove flew away. 
Opened her wings.
Isn't she a strange girl.
Loved and ran away.

My brave beloved.
Lean on the wall beloved.
Wall won't sooth suffering.
Lean on me beloved.

My dear beloved.
My worshiped beloved.
Strangers have no mercy.
Won't you have mercy beloved.

Does my dove sleep?
Will she wake if I call?
You there, me here.
Can my heart stand it all?

Church has no bells.
Church is in disorder.
I traveled many lands.
Misket is prettiest there's no other. .

Many narrow streets.
Misket is sweetness.
May they dry and scale.
Lips that give you kisses.

Church bell ringing time.
Church organization time.
I've lost Misket.
Autumn is ballad time.

Can the sea be without water?
Can the sea be without sand?
I consulted the priest.
Can a young man be without his beloved?

See also
 Music of Turkey
 Turkish dance

References

Turkish music
Turkish words and phrases